Aconcagua may refer to:
Aconcagua, mountain in Mendoza, Argentina
Aconcagua Provincial Park, provincial park in Mendoza, Argentina
Universidad del Aconcagua, university in Mendoza, Argentina
San Felipe de Aconcagua Province, Valparaíso, Chile
Aconcagua River, Chile
Aconcagua (film), a 1964 Argentine film
Aconcagua (video game)
Aconcagua (culture) a Prehispanic culture of South America
Aconcagua (moth), a genus of moths
Aconcagua (wine region)
Aconcagua Point, The Triplets (Robert Island)
Aconcagua (1922 steamship), 
 British, Australian associations
 Compañía Sud Americana de Vapores liner, later U.S. Army Transport Aconcagua
 a C2 cargo ship, ex-Ocean Telegraph